Anthony Cotton may refer to:

 Antony Cotton (born 1975), English actor
 Anthony J. Cotton, United States Air Force general